Samantha is a female given name.

Samantha may also refer to:

Geography
Samantha, Alabama, an unincorporated community
Samantha, Ohio, an unincorporated community
3147 Samantha, an asteroid

Books
Samantha (novel), by Howard Fast (as E.V. Cunningham) (1967) later published as The Case of the Angry Actress

Film and TV
Samantha: An American Girl Holiday, TV movie based on the doll and book series
Samantha (film), a 1992 American movie
Samantha (telenovela), a 1998 Venezuelan telenovela
Samantha oups!, a 2004–2007 French television series, broadcast in Canada as Samantha
Samantha!, a 2018 Netflix comedy series

Music
Samantha (Toro y Moi album), a 2015 album by American artist Toro y Moi
"Samantha" (Margaret Berger song), an electropop song by Norwegian singer Margaret Berger
"Samantha" (Hole song), from the album Nobody's Daughter
"Samantha" (Kaela Kimura song), a 2007 single by Japanese singer Kaela Kimura
"Samantha" (Dave and J Hus song), a 2017 single by British rappers Dave and J Hus
"Samantha", a 1961 song by Kenny Ball And His Jazz Band
"Samantha", a 1964 song by Billy Strange
"Samantha", a 1969 song by Axiom (band)
"Samantha", a 1970 song by Balthazar (band)
"Samantha", a 1975 song by Crispian St. Peters
"Samantha", a 1978 song by Digby Richards
"Samantha", a 1980 song by Village People
"Samantha", a 1980 song by David London
"Samantha", a 1985 song by Madness (band)
"Samantha", a 1988 song by Diesel (band)
"Samantha", a 1998 song by Theatre of Tragedy

People
Samantha (actress) (Samantha Akkineni née Ruth Prabhu, born 1987), Indian actress
Samantha (singer) (Christiane Bervoets, born 1948), Belgian singer